School District 84 Vancouver Island West is a school district in British Columbia. It covers the northwest corner of Vancouver Island. This includes the major centre of Gold River and the remote communities of Tahsis, Zeballos and Kyuquot.

Schools

See also
List of school districts in British Columbia

Vancouver Island
84